The 1993–94 Slovenian Second League season started on 22 August 1993 and ended on 12 June 1994. Each team played a total of 30 matches.

League standing

See also
1993–94 Slovenian PrvaLiga
1993–94 Slovenian Third League

External links
Football Association of Slovenia 

Slovenian Second League seasons
2
Slovenia